Knightfall (Charise Carnes) is a fictional DC Comics character, an enemy of Batgirl (Barbara Gordon). She first appeared in Batgirl (vol. 4) #10 (August 2012) and was created by Gail Simone and Alitha Martinez.

Publication history
Knightfall was created by Gail Simone and Alitha Martinez. She first appeared as Charise Carnes in Batgirl (vol. 4) #10 (2012), but was not formally introduced as Knightfall until the following issue.

Origin
Charise Carnes and her younger brother Emil were born to William and Virginia Carnes, a rich and prestigious family in Gotham City thanks to her father's real estate dealings. He had bought a large landfill on the bayfront of Gotham and enacted the state's biggest land reclamation right on top of it. William Carnes was no saint, though, building his riches with muscle, bribes and countless judges in his pocket. Charise was aware of her father's corrupt practices, but idolized him all the same. She never thought another man could come close to the admiration she felt for her father, until she met Trevor. He was a kind boy who was the first one she met that did not seem to care about her family's riches. He certainly did not, as one night he came to her house with knives and made Charise bind her parents and little brother up with duct tape, after which he took three hours to cut them to pieces "for the lulz", all while Charise was forced to watch.

Afterwards, reportedly no evidence was found that someone else had committed the slaughter and so Charise was left as the only suspect. She was found guilty and sent to Arkham Asylum at age 18 due to prison overcrowding. Then there was a massive breakout at Arkham, where some of the sickest murderers in the country took guards hostage and "played" with them. Charise survived, but had been forced to watch this brutality for two straight days. This was what Charise had wanted, however. After Trevor had killed her family, she had realized that there were crimes that prison simply was not severe enough for as punishment. She had hidden the truth of the massacre in order to get sent to Arkham in order to learn "the craft of madness". She learned everything she could have wanted, especially under the tutelage of James Gordon Jr., while she was in Arkham.

Now reshaped as she saw fit, Charise used every one of her father's underhanded methods to get herself released from Arkham. She then set to work on saving Gotham from the madness and crime that had permeated it as Knightfall. As Charise Carnes, she would use her family's money to change Gotham for the better with community service programs and urban redevelopment; and as Knightfall, wielding the knives Trevor had used on her family, she and her Disgraced would use whatever means necessary to apprehend, torment and kill all criminals. She would rule Gotham and fix what civilization could not.

Knightfall descends
Following a charity event for her community service programs, Charise had her Disgraced see whether Batgirl would be willing to join their cause by having them threaten to kill a young carjacker, Ricky, whom they had previously caught in a bear-trap. Batgirl failed the test by saving the young man, after which Katharsis attacked her. Batgirl managed to gain the upper hand over Katharsis, but only until the rest of the Disgraced ganged up on her and Charise arrived in her Knightfall guise.

Knightfall presented Batgirl with a formal offer to join her and her Disgraced in their endeavors to completely eradicate crime in Gotham. Batgirl would not agree to kill anyone and so Charise ordered her Disgraced to kill her. Batgirl put up a good fight, but she was simply outnumbered and wound up being held aloft by her throat by the Bonebreaker while Knightfall prepared to kill her. Detective Melody McKenna suddenly appeared, however, and ordered Charise to let Batgirl go. McKenna was a cop who worked for Charise, although she had started questioning her methods as Knightfall, and she now threatened to expose everything she knew if Charise did not let Batgirl go. Charise let Batgirl and McKenna leave, apparently not considering either of them much of a threat.

Charise later calls McKenna and orders Batgirl to meet her, telling her that they have captured Ricky again and that they will skin him, gut him and burn him alive if she does not come. Batgirl comes to the agreed location and tangles with the Disgraced again, except she brings McKenna and Batwoman as backup, who handle the Disgraced while Batgirl goes to find Charise. She winds up finding a badly injured Ricky in a cage with another tortured man. She tries to pick the lock, but Charise comes up behind her and stabs her in the stomach.

With Batgirl bleeding profusely, Charise lectures her on how it is the fault of people like her that Gotham is overrun with crime. When Batgirl collapses on the floor, she calls the Bonebreaker to come to dispose of her body, but Batgirl steadies herself and brings the fight to Charise. During the fight, Charise decides to show Batgirl just who she is behind the mask of Knightfall. She tells Batgirl her story: her father's corrupt ways, Trevor's slaughtering of her family and how she had chosen to go to Arkham to learn the way of criminals. She also reveals that the other man in the cage with Ricky is, in fact, Trevor, who she has been meticulously torturing for the last few months as his punishment. Batgirl is horrified by this and they continue fighting, although she is still fading from her stab wound. Charise has the upper hand until Ricky grabs her from inside the cage and gives Batgirl a clear hit. Charise goes down, but mocks Batgirl, telling her that she has more than enough officials in her pocket to stay out of prison with no cop who would even dare arrest her. Batwoman and McKenna then step in, with McKenna more than willing to be the cop who makes that arrest. Charise still taunts Batgirl, claiming that she will tear Gotham apart, but Batgirl firmly accepts the challenge.

Two days later, Charise's Disgraced is seen visiting some of Batgirl's latest rogues (the Mirror, Gretel and Grotesque) in their respective prisons, offering to get them out of prison if they will simply kill Batgirl.

Powers and abilities
Knightfall is a masterfully devious tactician, able to easily go from her facade of a vulnerable young girl to her true, ruthless self. She has a vast network of lawyers, judges and other officials at her beck and call due to anything ranging from blackmail to bribery. Her family's fortune gives her a great amount of capital for her endeavors, a fortune she maintains through business deals and charity events. She is also a formidable combatant with the two knives she wields that were used to slaughter her family.

References

Comics characters introduced in 2012
Characters created by Gail Simone
DC Comics female supervillains
Vigilante characters in comics
Batgirl